A Picture of Britain is a 2005 BBC television documentary series presented by David Dimbleby, which describes the British landscape and the art which it has inspired. In each of the six 1-hour episodes Dimbleby explores a different British region and discusses the ways that its landscape and culture have influenced painters, poets and composers.

The series is shot in 16:9 widescreen.

Episodes
 The Romantic North (5 June 2005)
 The Flatlands (12 June 2005)
 Highlands and Glens (19 June 2005)
 The Heart of England (26 June 2005)
 The Home Front (3 July 2005)
 The Mystical West (10 July 2005)

Production
The series was produced in association with Tate Britain; the accompanying  2005 book authored by Dimbleby has been published by Tate Publishing.

DVD release
The region 2 DVD release of the series is by Contender Home Entertainment. It has also been packaged as part of a box set together with series 1 of Coast.

External links

2005 British television series debuts
2005 British television series endings
Picture of Britain
British television documentaries
English-language television shows